PS Pen Cw was a tug built for the Great Western Railway in 1912.

History

The Pen Cw was built by Eltringham and Company in South Shields and launched on 24 October 1912. She was used as a tug for tender operations at Fishguard Harbour.

On 1 July 1927 she was sold to the Tees Towing Company in Middlesbrough for £1,750 and renamed Ingleby Cross. On 29 November 1933 she was sold to the Grangemouth and Forth Towing Company and renamed Elie. From November 1939 to February 1942 she was requisitioned by the Admiralty and used in Rosyth Dockyard.

In December 1962 she was sent to White and Co at St Davids on Forth for scrapping.

References

1912 ships
Passenger ships of the United Kingdom
Paddle steamers of the United Kingdom
Steamships of the United Kingdom
Ships built on the River Tyne
Ships of the Great Western Railway